Peck Mountain may refer to:

 Peck Mountain (Alabama)
 Peck Mountain (Litchfield County, Connecticut)
 Peck Mountain (New Haven County, Connecticut)
 Peck Mountain (Idaho)
 Peck Mountain (Missouri)
 Peck Mountain (South Carolina)